Aris Enkelmann (born 29 April 1964) is a German fencer. He competed in the individual and team foil events for East Germany at the 1988 Summer Olympics.

References

External links
 

1964 births
Living people
German male fencers
Olympic fencers of East Germany
Fencers at the 1988 Summer Olympics
Sportspeople from Frankfurt